This article presents a list of the historical events and publications of Australian literature during 1908.

Books 

 Edward Dyson 
 The Missing Link
 Tommy Minogue
 Mrs Aeneas Gunn – We of the Never Never
 Fergus Hume 
 The Crowned Skull
 The Devil's Ace
 Rosa Praed 
 By Their Fruits
 Stubble Before the Wind
 Henry Handel Richardson – Maurice Guest
 Steele Rudd – In Australia
 Edward S. Sorenson – The Squatter's Ward
 Ethel Turner – That Girl
 Lilian Turner – Paradise and the Perrys

Short stories 

 Louis Becke – The Pearl Divers of Roncador Reef and Other Stories
 Edward Dyson
 "The Disposal of a Dog"
 "The Rescue"
 Steele Rudd
 Dad in Politics and Other Stories
 For Life and Other Stories
 Edward S. Sorenson – Quinton's Rouseabout and Other Stories

Poetry 

 Arthur A. D. Bayldon – Later Verses
 Christopher Brennan – "Towards the Source : 1894-97 : 30"
 J. Le Gay Brereton – Sea and Sky
 Victor J. Daley – "The Road of Roses"
 C. J. Dennis 
 "The Austra-laise"
 "Comin' Home From Shearin'"
 Mabel Forrest – "The Call of the North"
 Henry Lawson 
 "Meditations on a Pawn Ticket"
 "One Hundred and Three"
 Will Lawson – Stokin' and Other Verses
 Dorothea Mackellar – "My Country"
 John Shaw Neilson – "The Sundowner"
 Edward S. Sorenson – "Bill Brown"

Drama 

 Miles Franklin
 The Scandal-Monger
 The Survivors: A Modern Play in Four Acts
 Sumner Locke – "The Vicissitudes of Vivienne"

Births 

A list, ordered by date of birth (and, if the date is either unspecified or repeated, ordered alphabetically by surname) of births in 1908 of Australian literary figures, authors of written works or literature-related individuals follows, including year of death.

 2 April – Ronald McCuaig, poet (died 1993)
 23 May – F. J. Thwaites, novelist (died 1979)
 9 October – Harry Hooton, poet (died 1961)
 4 November – Colin Simpson, journalist and travel writer (died 1983)
 30 November – Eric Irvin, historian and poet (died 1993)

Deaths 

A list, ordered by date of death (and, if the date is either unspecified or repeated, ordered alphabetically by surname) of deaths in 1908 of Australian literary figures, authors of written works or literature-related individuals follows, including year of birth.

 14 November – Ernest Favenc, poet and short story writer (born 1845)

See also 
 1908 in poetry
 List of years in literature
 List of years in Australian literature
1908 in literature
1907 in Australian literature
1908 in Australia
1909 in Australian literature

References

Literature
Australian literature by year
20th-century Australian literature